The 2016 CIS Men's Final 8 Basketball Tournament was held March 17–20, 2016 in Vancouver, British Columbia., hosted by the University of British Columbia at the Doug Mitchell Thunderbird Sports Centre. This was the second time UBC hosted, and the third time the tournament was played in B.C.

In dynastic fashion, the Carleton Ravens won their sixth straight title, their 12th in 14 years, this time over the Calgary Dinos. The Ryerson Rams, ranked number one in the country going into the tournament (a first in any sport for the school), took the bronze medal over the Dalhousie Tigers in a second consecutive third-place finish. Carleton set a record with the win, earning the most national championships in men's basketball than any top division college in Canada or the United States. (Carleton and UCLA were tied with 11 wins, prior to this.)

All tournament games were shown live online via the CIS website (using Stretch Internet), with the semi-final and final games on a pay-per-view basis. The semi-final and final games were on television's Sportsnet 360 and on its online service.

This proved to be the last Men's Final 8 branded as a CIS championship. On October 20, 2016, Canadian Interuniversity Sport, the country's governing body for university athletics and the organizer of the Final 8, changed its name to U Sports.

Participating Teams

Championship Bracket
* – Denotes overtime period

Consolation Bracket

References 

2016
2015–16 in Canadian basketball
2016 in British Columbia